"Necromancy in Naat" is a short story by American author Clark Ashton Smith as part of his Zothique cycle, and first published in the July 1936 issue of Weird Tales.

Plot
Nomad prince Yadar finds his betrothed Dalili taken up by bandits during his hunt for gazelles in the "half-desert" region Zyra. Yadar begins a quest to find Dalili. With four of his men, they search the capitals of Zothique. While fever takes Yadar's men, Yadar finds that Dalili was sold as a slave girl to the king of Yoros as settlement for a treaty. Taking passage on a galley carrying grain and wine to Yoros, the ship is whisked off in a current called the Black River. Far from shore, Yadar learns from the galley crew that between there and the edge of the world is a land called Naat ruled by necromancers. As the galley shipwrecks onto Naat, Yadar is rescued by an undead woman. Yadar learns that the undead woman is Dalili. Initially happy, Yadar finds that undead Dalili does not reciprocate. On the beach, Yadar meets three of the necromancers (elder Vacarn and his sons Vokal and Uldalla) amid incantations. The necromancers invite Yadar to dinner where he finds the undead as servants. During the meal, he learns he was chosen rather than by chance he survived. A cannibal joins the dinner as a guest but a weasel-like creature named Esrit drinks his blood. The prince wonders if a similar fate waits for him. Two of the necromancers (Uldalla and Vokal) offer a deal for Yadar to kill their father. In return, they offer Yadar a galley, an undead crew, and Dalili. Yadar accepts. However, the murder goes awry and Yadar is mortally wounded. Reanimated, Yadar finds that Vokal and the father are burning on a funeral pyre. Undead Yadar works under the remaining necromancer Uldalla who succumbs to madness and later disembowels himself. While both are undead, Yadar works alongside Dalili which is some consolation.

Themes
In the 1988 book Fantasy: The 100 Best Books, James Cawthorn and Michael Moorcock noted the stories "Necromancy in Naat", "The Witchcraft of Ulua", and "The Black Abbot of Puthuum" on the theme of love and lust.

Reception
Reviewing Lost Worlds in the 1983 book The Guide to Supernatural Fiction, E. F. Bleiler recommended the "best stories are "The Seven Geases", "The Isle of the Torturers", "Necromancy in Naat", which may well be Smith's three best weird stories."

See also 
Clark Ashton Smith bibliography

References

External links

Text of "Necromancy in Naat"

Short stories by Clark Ashton Smith
Fantasy short stories
1936 short stories
Works originally published in Weird Tales